In 1978 the New Zealand national rugby union team, the All Blacks, toured Britain and Ireland. They were the eighth All Black team to undertake a full tour of the countries and became the first to achieve a Grand Slam by beating the national teams of Ireland, Wales, England and Scotland. The previous seven touring teams had either lost or drawn at least one international, or had not played all four nations.

The New Zealand team played eighteen matches between 18 October and 16 December, winning seventeen games and losing once, to Munster at Thomond Park, Limerick. This was the first time that an All Black team had been beaten in Ireland and it remained the All Blacks' only defeat by any Irish team until they lost to the Ireland national team in 2016. The Munster victory inspired a stage play, Alone it Stands.

Although the All Blacks won their four international matches, three of the games were undecided until close to the end. The match against Ireland was level 6–6 at the end of normal time and was settled by Andy Dalton's try in injury time. Against Wales, a 78th-minute penalty goal by replacement full-back Brian McKechnie turned a 12–10 deficit into a 13–12 win. In the Scotland game the All Blacks led 12–9 going into injury time and a drop goal attempt by Ian McGeechan, which would have tied the scores if successful, was charged down and led to a breakaway try for New Zealand by Bruce Robertson.

Matches
Scores and results list New Zealand's points tally first.

Test matches

Ireland

The All Blacks opened the scoring with a dropped goal by Bruce, with Ward's penalty making the score 3–3 at half-time. Bruce put the visitors ahead again with a further dropped goal before Ward levelled again with another penalty. The score remained at 6–6 as the game went into injury time but an unconverted try by Dalton after Donaldson's break from a line-out gave New Zealand a 10–6 victory. Rothmans Yearbook called it a "tense, if unspectacular, struggle in perfect playing conditions" and asserted that the All Blacks "deserved their narrow victory" after winning 31 of the 40 line-outs in the game.

NEW ZEALAND: Clive Currie, Stu Wilson, Bill Osborne, Mark Taylor, Brian Ford (rep Bryan Williams), Doug Bruce, Mark Donaldson, Billy Bush, Andy Dalton, Brad Johnstone, Andy Haden, Frank Oliver, Graham Mourie (c), Leicester Rutledge, Gary Seear.

IRELAND: Lawrence Moloney, Terry Kennedy, Mike Gibson, Alistair McKibbin, Freddie McLennan, Tony Ward, Colin Patterson, Ned Byrne, Pa Whelan, Phil Orr, Moss Keane, Donal Spring, Fergus Slattery, Shay Deering (c), Willie Duggan

Wales

England

Scotland

Touring party

Manager: Russell Thomas
Assistant Manager: Jack Gleeson
Captain: Graham Mourie
Physiotherapist: Brian McKenzie

Full back
Clive Currie, Brian McKechnie, Richard Wilson

Three-quarters
Stu Wilson, Robert Kururangi, Brian Ford, Bryan Williams, Bruce Robertson, Lyn Jaffray, Mark Taylor, Bill Osborne

Half-backs
Doug Bruce, Eddie Dunn, Dave Loveridge, Mark Donaldson

Forwards
Brad Johnstone, John Ashworth, John McEldowney, Gary Knight, Andy Dalton, John Black, Billy Bush, John Fleming, John Loveday, Andy Haden, Frank Oliver, Barry Ashworth, Leicester Rutledge, Graham Mourie, Wayne Graham, Gary Seear, Ash McGregor

References

Sources

External links
 1978 Tour in Details

1978
1978
1978
1978
1978
Tour
1978–79 in Irish rugby union
1978–79 in English rugby union
1978–79 in Welsh rugby union
1978–79 in Scottish rugby union
1978–79 in British rugby union